St. Joseph's Catholic Church, also commonly known as St. Joseph's on Capitol Hill, is a parish of the Roman Catholic Church in the Capitol Hill neighborhood of Washington, D.C., in the Archdiocese of Washington. The church is located less than half a mile from the United States Capitol Building and United States Supreme Court Building.

The church was founded by German immigrants. On October 25, 1868 when a reported crowd of 20,000 people, including President Andrew Johnson, came to lay the cornerstone. The architect was from Cologne, Germany and modeled St. Joseph's design after the Cologne Cathedral. The church was constructed of brown stone from Hershey, Pennsylvania and cost $75,000 to build. It was dedicated on January 18, 1891. Masses were originally said in Latin (as it was everywhere before 1964) with homilies in German until Italian immigrant stonemasons working on expansion of the Capitol began joining the congregation. The church underwent an extensive renovation and restoration beginning in 2002.

The church's proximity to the Supreme Court, Capitol, and congressional office buildings have attracted many members of Congress, congressional staffers, and Supreme Court justices to daily Mass. St. Joseph is located on the Senate side of the Capitol, and is commonly known as the Senate church, while its counterpart on the House side of the Capitol, St. Peter's, is commonly known as the House church. Those known to attend daily Mass at St. Joseph's include Senator John E. Kenna, Senator Robert F. Kennedy, Senator Ted Kennedy, and Antonin Scalia. In 2017, the church began holding an annual "Gold Mass" for congressional staffers.

See also 

St. Peter's Church (Washington, D.C.)

References

External links 
 

Religious organizations established in 1868
Roman Catholic churches in Washington, D.C.
1868 establishments in Washington, D.C.
Roman Catholic churches completed in 1891
Capitol Hill
19th-century Roman Catholic church buildings in the United States